The Saflieni phase is one of the eleven phases of Maltese prehistory, the fourth of five in the middle or Temple period. It is named for the Ħal-Saflieni Hypogeum, an underground temple complex now recognised as a World Heritage Site by UNESCO, which was built mainly in this period.

The Saflieni phase, from approximately 3300–3000 BC, is a brief transitional phase between the Ġgantija and Tarxien phases, the two main phases during which the principal Megalithic temples of Malta were built. Saflieni-phase ceramics may provide a useful indication of separation between the two long phases.  They have been recovered a number of Megalithic sites, including: the top level of the remains at Santa Verna at Xagħra in Gozo; from the eastern part of the temple of Ta' Ħaġrat in Mġarr; and from the lower levels of the east temple at Skorba.

References

Neolithic cultures of Europe
Archaeological cultures of Southern Europe
Archaeological cultures in Malta
Pre-Indo-Europeans
Megalithic Temples of Malta
Maltese prehistory